Dark Harvest is a 2016 Canadian thriller film written an directed by James Hutson as his directorial debut. The film stars Cheech Marin in his first marijuana film in 33 years.  After success on the festival circuit, the film gained a distribution deal for 2018.

Production

Filmmaker James Hutson was inspired to create this film based upon his experiences acting in training films for his local police department. The role of Bernie was played by Hutson's acting teacher A. C. Peterson who at the time was recovering from hip surgery. The inclusion of a bear trap injuring the character of Bernie, allowed the film to take advantage of the limp resulting from Peterson's his healing hip, and became the "inciting incident" and thrust of the film.

Plot
On the eve of its becoming legal, a marijuana grower is murdered. His best friend Carter (James Hutson), against the advice of his mentor Ricardo (Cheech Marin), teams up with narcotics investigator Bernie (A.C. Peterson) to discover the reasons and find the killer.

Cast

Reception

The film received positive response from The Hollywood Reporter, praising Cheech Marin's stoic performance, and writing that "strong performances and compelling atmosphere make up for the overly convoluted plotting."

Awards & nominations
 2016, Won "Audience Award" at Edmonton International Film Festival
 2016, Won "Canadian Feature Award" at Edmonton International Film Festival 
 2016, Won "Best Picture" at Columbia Gorge International Film Festival
 2016, Won "Best Picture" at Columbia Gorge International Film Festival 
 2016, Won "Best Picture" at Oregon Independent Film Festival
 2016, Won "Best Supporting Actor" for Cheech Marin at Oregon Independent Film Festival
 2016, Won "Best Thriller" at Oregon Independent Film Festival 
 2016, Won "Best Actor" for Alan C. Peterson at CannaBus Culture Film Festival
 2017, Nominated for Best Direction in a Motion Picture by Leo Awards

References

External links
 
 

2016 crime thriller films
Canadian crime thriller films
Canadian independent films
English-language Canadian films
2016 films
Films about drugs
Films shot in Vancouver
2016 independent films
2016 directorial debut films
2010s English-language films
2010s Canadian films